The John Moses Browning House is a historic house within the Ogden Central Bench Historic District in Ogden, Utah, United States, that is individually listed on the National Register of Historic Places (NRHP). It was the primary residence of American gun maker John Moses Browning from the turn of the 20th century until his death in 1926.

Description
The house was built between 1890 and 1900 and is located at 505 27th Street. The home is a 6,700 square foot, two and a half story, eight bedroom mansion built of sandstone and red brick. The home remained in the Browning family until 1940 when it was sold and converted into apartments.  In the mid 1940s the building was purchased by the YWCA and housed a women's shelter before being sold again to a law firm that used it as office space. In 2001 it was renovated again and converted back into a private residence.  The property was listed on the National Register of Historic Places in 1973. It was listed on the NRHP Apri 24, 1973.

See also

 National Register of Historic Places listings in Weber County, Utah
 John Moses Browning

References

External links

Houses in Weber County, Utah
Houses on the National Register of Historic Places in Utah
Buildings and structures in Ogden, Utah
National Register of Historic Places in Weber County, Utah